Faridpur is a village in the Punjab province of Pakistan. It is located in Khanewal District at 30°32'0N 71°52'0E with an altitude of 121 metres (400 feet).

References

Khanewal District